Pacific Northwest '73–'74: The Complete Recordings is a live album by the rock band the Grateful Dead.  It contains six complete concerts recorded in the Pacific Northwest in 1973 and 1974, on 19 CDs.  It was released, in a limited edition of 15,000 copies, on September 7, 2018.

A 3-CD album of songs selected from Pacific Northwest '73–'74: The Complete Recordings, titled Pacific Northwest '73–'74: Believe It If You Need It, was released the same day.

Pacific Northwest '73–'74: The Complete Recordings was nominated for a Grammy Award for Best Boxed or Special Limited Edition Package.  The CDs are contained in a bentwood box decorated with First Nations-inspired art by Roy Henry Vickers.

Concerts 
The concert recordings included in the album are:
 June 22, 1973 – P.N.E. Coliseum, Vancouver, British Columbia
 June 24, 1973 – Portland Memorial Coliseum, Portland, Oregon
 June 26, 1973 – Seattle Center Arena, Seattle, Washington
 May 17, 1974 – P.N.E. Coliseum, Vancouver, British Columbia
 May 19, 1974 – Portland Memorial Coliseum, Portland, Oregon
 May 21, 1974 – Hec Edmundson Pavilion, Seattle, Washington

Track listing

June 22, 1973 – P.N.E. Coliseum, Vancouver, British Columbia 
Disc 1
First set:
"Bertha" (Jerry Garcia, Robert Hunter) – 6:30
"Beat It On Down the Line" (Jesse Fuller) – 3:41
"Deal" (Garcia, Hunter) – 5:00
"Mexicali Blues" (Bob Weir, John Perry Barlow) – 4:02
"Box of Rain" (Phil Lesh, Hunter) – 5:47
"Bird Song" (Garcia, Hunter) – 14:29
"The Race Is On" (Don Rollins) – 3:17
"Sugaree" (Garcia, Hunter) – 8:05
"Looks Like Rain" (Weir, Barlow) – 7:34
"Row Jimmy" (Garcia, Hunter) – 9:22
"Jack Straw" (Weir, Hunter) – 5:01

Disc 2
"China Cat Sunflower" > (Garcia, Hunter) – 8:39
"I Know You Rider" (traditional, arranged by Grateful Dead) – 5:48
"Big River" (Johnny Cash) – 5:01
"Tennessee Jed" (Garcia, Hunter) – 8:00
"Playing in the Band" (Weir, Mickey Hart, Hunter) – 18:59
Second set:
"Here Comes Sunshine" (Garcia, Hunter) – 12:25
"Promised Land" (Chuck Berry) – 2:58
"Brown-Eyed Women" (Garcia, Hunter) – 5:30
"El Paso" (Marty Robbins) – 4:33

Disc 3
"Black Peter" (Garcia, Hunter) – 9:23
"Greatest Story Ever Told" (Weir, Hunter) – 5:00
"Big Railroad Blues" (Noah Lewis) – 3:56
"He's Gone" > (Garcia, Hunter) – 11:24
"Truckin'" > (Garcia, Lesh, Weir, Hunter) – 26:06
"The Other One" (Weir, Bill Kreutzmann) – 15:22
"Wharf Rat" (Garcia, Hunter) – 8:05

Disc 4
"Sugar Magnolia" (Weir, Hunter) – 9:57
"Casey Jones" (Garcia, Hunter) – 7:31
Encore:
"Johnny B. Goode" (Berry) – 3:56

June 24, 1973 – Portland Memorial Coliseum, Portland, Oregon 

Disc 5
First set:
"Promised Land" (Berry) – 3:43
"Loser" (Garcia, Hunter) – 7:09
"Mexicali Blues" (Weir, Barlow) – 3:53
"They Love Each Other" (Garcia, Hunter) – 5:48
"Looks Like Rain" (Weir, Barlow) – 7:52
"Box of Rain" (Lesh, Hunter) – 5:30
"Big Railroad Blues" (Lewis) – 4:20
"Jack Straw" (Weir, Hunter) – 5:02
"Sugaree" (Garcia, Hunter) – 7:24
"The Race Is On" (Rollins) – 3:27
"Row Jimmy" (Garcia, Hunter) – 8:30
"Beat It On Down the Line" (Fuller) – 3:30
"China Cat Sunflower" (Garcia, Hunter)  > – 6:47
"I Know You Rider" (traditional, arranged by Grateful Dead) – 5:05

Disc 6
"Around and Around" (Berry) – 5:06
Second set:
"Mississippi Half-Step Uptown Toodeloo" (Garcia, Hunter) – 8:44
"You Ain't Woman Enough" (Loretta Lynn) – 3:42
"El Paso" (Robbins) – 4:35
"Stella Blue" (Garcia, Hunter) – 7:57
"Greatest Story Ever Told" > (Weir, Hunter) – 5:04
"Bertha" (Garcia, Hunter) – 6:12
"Big River" (Cash) – 4:47

Disc 7
"Dark Star" > (Garcia, Hart, Kreutzmann, Lesh, Ron "Pigpen" McKernan, Weir, Hunter)  – 27:46
"Eyes of the World" > (Garcia, Hunter) – 15:40
"China Doll" (Garcia, Hunter) – 6:38
"Sugar Magnolia" (Weir, Hunter) – 9:40
Encore:
"One More Saturday Night" (Weir) – 5:16

June 26, 1973 – Seattle Center Arena, Seattle, Washington 

Disc 8
First set:
"Casey Jones" > (Garcia, Hunter) – 6:01
"Greatest Story Ever Told" (Weir, Hunter) – 5:33
"Brown-Eyed Women" (Garcia, Hunter) – 5:47
"Jack Straw" (Weir, Hunter) – 5:04
"Box of Rain" (Lesh, Hunter) – 5:35
"Deal" (Garcia, Hunter) – 4:23
"Mexicali Blues" (Weir, Barlow) – 4:08
"You Ain't Woman Enough" (Lynn) – 3:47
"Row Jimmy" (Garcia, Hunter) – 9:06
"The Race Is On" (Rollins) – 3:34
"China Cat Sunflower" > (Garcia, Hunter) – 8:08
"I Know You Rider" (traditional, arranged by Grateful Dead) – 6:00
"Beat It On Down the Line" (Fuller) – 3:28
"Loser" (Garcia, Hunter) – 6:50

Disc 9
"Playing in the Band" (Weir, Hart, Hunter) – 15:49
Second set:
"Bertha" (Garcia, Hunter) – 5:56
"Promised Land" (Berry) – 3:27
"They Love Each Other" (Garcia, Hunter) – 5:46
"El Paso" (Robbins) – 4:28
"Black Peter" (Garcia, Hunter) – 9:18
"Big River" (Cash) – 4:58
"Here Comes Sunshine" (Garcia, Hunter) – 11:58
"Me and My Uncle" (John Phillips) – 3:11

Disc 10
"He's Gone" > (Garcia, Hunter) – 13:59
"Truckin'" > (Garcia, Lesh, Weir, Hunter) – 10:55
"The Other One" > (Weir, Kreutzmann) – 6:33
"Me and Bobby McGee" > (Kris Kristofferson) – 5:25
"The Other One" > (Weir, Kreutzmann) – 18:06
"Sugar Magnolia" (Weir, Hunter) – 10:03
Encore:
"Johnny B. Goode" (Berry) – 3:56

May 17, 1974 – P.N.E. Coliseum, Vancouver, British Columbia 

Disc 11
First set:
"Promised Land" (Berry) – 3:33
"Deal" (Garcia, Hunter) – 4:45
"The Race Is On" (Rollins) – 3:34
"Ramble On Rose" (Garcia, Hunter) – 6:56
"Jack Straw" (Weir, Hunter) – 5:16
"Dire Wolf" (Garcia, Hunter) – 5:28
"Beat It On Down the Line" (Fuller) – 3:53
"Loose Lucy" (Garcia, Hunter) – 5:07
"Big River" (Cash) – 5:22
"It Must Have Been the Roses" (Hunter) – 5:47
"Mexicali Blues" (Weir, Barlow) – 3:48
"Row Jimmy" (Garcia, Hunter) – 8:59

Disc 12
"Playing in the Band" (Weir, Hart, Hunter) – 23:07
Second set:
"U.S. Blues" (Garcia, Hunter) – 6:09
"Me and My Uncle" (Phillips) – 3:17
"Ship of Fools" (Garcia, Hunter) – 6:27
"Money Money" (Weir, Barlow) – 4:45
"China Cat Sunflower" > (Garcia, Hunter) – 8:20
"I Know You Rider" (traditional, arranged by Grateful Dead) – 5:22

Disc 13
"Greatest Story Ever Told" (Weir, Hunter) – 5:27
"Sugaree" (Garcia, Hunter) – 8:18
"Truckin'" > (Garcia, Lesh, Weir, Hunter) – 9:56
"Nobody's Fault But Mine" > (traditional, arranged by Grateful Dead) – 5:14
"Eyes of the World" > (Garcia, Hunter) – 13:19
"China Doll" (Garcia, Hunter)  – 6:01
"Sugar Magnolia" (Weir, Hunter) – 9:21

May 19, 1974 – Portland Memorial Coliseum, Portland, Oregon 

Disc 14
First set:
"Mississippi Half-Step Uptown Toodeloo" (Garcia, Hunter) – 8:14
"Mexicali Blues" (Weir, Barlow) – 3:58
"Big Railroad Blues" (Lewis) – 3:57
"Black-Throated Wind" (Weir, Barlow) – 7:08
"Scarlet Begonias" (Garcia, Hunter) – 5:12
"Beat It On Down the Line" (Fuller) – 3:47
"Tennessee Jed" (Garcia, Hunter) – 8:27
"Me and Bobby McGee" (Kristofferson) – 6:02
"Sugaree" (Garcia, Hunter) – 7:31
"Jack Straw" (Weir, Hunter) – 5:23
"It Must Have Been the Roses" (Hunter) – 5:28
"El Paso" (Robbins) – 4:35
"Loose Lucy" (Garcia, Hunter) – 5:07
"Money Money" (Weir, Barlow) – 4:27

Disc 15
"China Cat Sunflower" > (Garcia, Hunter) – 8:34
"I Know You Rider" (traditional, arranged by Grateful Dead) – 5:40
Second set:
"Promised Land" > (Berry) – 3:37
"Bertha" > (Garcia, Hunter) – 6:08
"Greatest Story Ever Told" (Weir, Hunter) – 6:10
"Ship of Fools" (Garcia, Hunter) – 6:36
"Weather Report Suite" > (Weir, Eric Andersen) – 17:58
"Wharf Rat" (Garcia, Hunter) – 10:49
"Big River" (Cash) – 5:36
"Peggy-O" (traditional, arranged by Grateful Dead)  – 8:11

Disc 16
"Truckin'" > (Garcia, Lesh, Weir, Hunter) – 9:15
"Jam" > (Grateful Dead) – 9:58
"Not Fade Away" > (Buddy Holly, Norman Petty) – 6:58
"Goin' Down the Road Feeling Bad" (traditional, arranged by Grateful Dead) – 6:59
"One More Saturday Night" (Weir) – 5:36
Encore:
"U.S. Blues" (Garcia, Hunter) – 5:37

May 21, 1974 – Hec Edmundson Pavilion, Seattle, Washington 

Disc 17
First set:
"Me and My Uncle" (Phillips) – 3:25
"Brown-Eyed Women" (Garcia, Hunter) – 5:20
"Beat It On Down the Line" (Fuller) – 3:47
"Deal" (Garcia, Hunter) – 4:55
"Mexicali Blues" (Weir, Hunter) – 3:59
"It Must Have Been the Roses" (Hunter) – 5:45
"The Race Is On" (Rollins) – 3:34
"Scarlet Begonias" (Garcia, Hunter) – 5:55
"El Paso" (Robbins) – 4:56
"Row Jimmy" (Garcia, Hunter) – 9:25
"Money Money" (Weir, Barlow) – 5:01
"Ship of Fools" (Garcia, Hunter) – 6:18

Disc 18
"Weather Report Suite" > (Weir, Andersen) – 17:22
"China Doll" (Garcia, Hunter) – 5:48
Second set:
"Playing in the Band" (Weir, Hart, Hunter) – 46:59
"U.S. Blues" (Garcia, Hunter) – 5:47

Disc 19
"Big River" (Cash) – 5:24
"Stella Blue" (Garcia, Hunter) – 8:40
"Around and Around" (Berry) – 5:25
"Eyes of the World" > (Garcia, Hunter) – 13:52
"Wharf Rat" > (Garcia, Hunter) – 9:45
"Sugar Magnolia" (Weir, Hunter) – 10:03
Encore:
"Johnny B. Goode" (Berry) – 4:08

Personnel 
Grateful Dead
Jerry Garcia – lead guitar, vocals
Donna Jean Godchaux – vocals
Keith Godchaux – keyboards
Bill Kreutzmann – drums
Phil Lesh – bass, vocals
Bob Weir – rhythm guitar, vocals
Production
Produced by Grateful Dead
Produced for release by David Lemieux
Mastering: Jeffrey Norman
Recording: Rex Jackson (1973), Kidd Candelario (1974)
Analog tape transfers and restoration: John K. Chester, Jamie Howarth - Plangent Processes
Cover art: Roy Henry Vickers
Photos: Richie Pechner
Liner notes: Nicholas G. Meriwether

Charts

References 

Grateful Dead live albums
Rhino Records live albums
2018 live albums